Telera may refer to:

 Telera (Dominican bread), in Dominican Republic cuisine
 Telera (Mexican bread), a sandwich bread
 Telera (Spanish bread), a shaped bread from Córdoba